Castlelyons is a small village in the east of County Cork, Ireland. It is also a civil parish in the barony of Barrymore. The name is derived from a stronghold of the Uí Liatháin - an early medieval kingdom. In the 2016 census it recorded a population of 374. Castlelyons is part of the Cork East Dáil constituency.

There are two stone bridges that cross the River Bride into the village - one a small footbridge and the other a bridge which was part of the entrance into Barrymore Castle - the seat of the Earls of Barrymore. The parish has two churches at Bridesbridge and Coolagown, and also boasts a castle, two abbeys, a mausoleum, two holy wells, and many other historical sights.

History
The Catholic parish of Castlelyons today is made up of three main districts - Coolagown, Britway and Castlelyons/Bridesbridge. Three quarters of the parish extend along the banks of the River Bride.

Castlelyons Friary existed between the 14th and 18th centuries.

During the English Civil War, the Battle of Castlelyons in 1645 was fought near the village.

Sport
Hunting, shooting and fishing are popular in the area and there is both a gun club and an angling club. The also village has a pitch and putt course. 

The village has squash courts and a Gaelic Athletic Association (GAA) pitch. Castlelyons GAA is the local GAA club.

People
Thomas Kent, an Irish nationalist court-martialled and executed following a gunfight with the Royal Irish Constabulary (RIC) on 2 May 1916, in the immediate aftermath of the Easter Rising.
William Brouncker, 2nd Viscount Brouncker, the celebrated mathematician, born here in 1620.

See also
 Nance the Piper
 Lyons (disambiguation)
 Lehane
 Castlemartyr
 List of towns and villages in Ireland

References

External links
 St. Nicholas Cemetery, Castlelyons

Towns and villages in County Cork
Holy wells in Ireland
Civil parishes of County Cork